The following is a discography of Skepta, a British MC from Tottenham, London. He is a producer and DJ commonly associated with the North London grime scene, including Roll Deep and Boy Better Know. Skepta released his debut album Greatest Hits on 17 September 2007. It was released on the Boy Better Know label. Skepta self-released the first single "Rolex Sweep" in September 2008, which reached number 89 on the UK Singles Chart. He released the album Microphone Champion on 1 June 2009. The single "Too Many Man", with JME, Wiley, Frisco and Shorty, charted at number 79.

Skepta has released five singles off his third studio album Doin' It Again (first with a major label): "Bad Boy", "Rescue Me", "Cross My Heart" featuring Preeya Kalidas, "So Alive" and "Amnesia", as well as a video for "Hello Good Morning" (Grime Remix). Three singles reached the Top 40 of the UK Singles Chart, with "Rescue Me" being the most successful at number 14. "Cross My Heart" came in at number 31 and dropped out of the Top 40 a week later. Doin' it Again spent three weeks in the top 100 album charts and debuted and peaked at number 19 on its first week of release. In 2012, Skepta released two singles from his forthcoming fourth album.

Skepta's second major label album, The Honeymoon, was intended to be released in the fourth quarter of 2011, but was delayed until 2012. After a disappointing response from the first two singles Skepta decided to release a purchasable mixtape, titled Blacklisted. This was released on 2 December 2012 along with music videos to support the release. In March 2014, Skepta provided a verse for the remix of "German Whip" by Meridian Dan. In the same month, he debuted his new single, "That's Not Me", featuring his brother, JME. Released on 8 June 2014, the song peaked at number 21 on the UK Singles Chart.

Albums

Studio albums

Collaborative albums

Mixtapes

EPs

Singles

As lead artist

As featured artist

Promotional singles

Other charted and certified songs

Guest appearances

Production discography

2007
Skepta – Greatest Hits
 1. "The Journey"
 2. "I'm There"
 3. "Duppy (Doin' It Again)" (featuring Bearman, Bossman, Footsie, Jme, Jammer, MC Creed, Trim and Wiley)
 4. "Listen Up"
 9. "In a Corner" (featuring Flowdan and Trigga)
 11. "Sweet Mother"
 12. "Shape Shifting"
 13. "Blood, Sweat and Tears" (featuring Jme and Shorty)
 14. "Cold Turkey"

2008
Kano - 140 Grime St
 5. "These MC's" (featuring Skepta)

2014
Wiley - Snakes & Ladders
 2. "On a Level"

2016
Skepta - Konnichiwa
 1. "Konnichiwa" (produced with Ragz Originale)
 2. "Lyrics" (featuring Novelist)
 3. "Corn on the Curb" (featuring Wiley and Chip)
 5. "It Ain't Safe" (featuring Young Lord)
 6. "Ladies Hit Squad" (featuring D Double E and ASAP Nast) (produced with Jason Adenuga)
 7. "Numbers" (featuring Pharrell Williams) (produced with Pharrell Williams)
 8. "Man" 
 9. "Shutdown" (produced with Ragz Originale)
 10. "That's Not Me" (featuring Jme)

2017
Skepta - Vicious
 1. "Still"
 2. "Sit Down" (featuring Lil B)
 4. "Worst" (featuring Smoke Boys)
 5. "Hypocrisy"
 6. "Ghost Ride" (featuring ASAP Nast and ASAP Rocky)

2018
ASAP Rocky - Testing
 5. "Praise the Lord (Da Shine)" (featuring Skepta)

2019
Skepta - Ignorance Is Bliss
 1. "Bullet from a Gun" (produced with Ragz Originale)
 2. "Greaze Mode"
 3. "Redrum" (featuring Key!)
 4. "No Sleep"
 5. "What Do You Mean?" (featuring J Hus) (produced with iO)
 6. "Going Through It" (produced with IndigoChildRick)
 7. "Same Old Story"
 8. "Love Me Not" (featuring Cheb Rabi and B Live)
 9. "Animal Instinct" (featuring Lancey Foux) (produced with Trench)
 11. "You Wish"
 12. "Gangsta" (featuring Boy Better Know)
 13. "Pure Water"

2020
Skepta, Chip, and Young Adz - Insomnia
 1. "Mains"
 5. "St Tropez"

DJ Mixes
 Rinse:04 (2008)

References

Discographies of British artists
Production discographies